"Don't Talk (Put Your Head on My Shoulder)" is a song by American rock band the Beach Boys from their 1966 album Pet Sounds. Written by Brian Wilson and Tony Asher, it is a ballad about nonverbal communication between lovers. Musically, the song is distinguished for its chromaticism, the use of a string sextet, and its key ambiguity. It is among the most harmonically complex songs that Wilson ever composed.

Wilson sang lead and produced the track in early 1966 with the aid of 14 session musicians who variously played guitars, vibraphone, timpani, organ, piano, upright bass, a ride cymbal, violins, cello, and viola. It is one of three tracks on Pet Sounds where he is the only Beach Boy featured. Acts who have covered the song include Linda Ronstadt, Fennesz, Anne Sofie von Otter with Elvis Costello, and Jeff Beck with Johnny Depp.

Background and lyrics

"Don't Talk (Put Your Head on My Shoulder)" was written by Brian Wilson and Tony Asher about nonverbal communication between lovers. In the lyrics, the narrator observes of his lover, "I can hear so much in your sighs / and I can see so much in your eyes / There are words we both can say / But don't talk, put your head on my shoulder". The narrator is generally celebratory of the time that the couple are spending together, although the line "let's not think about tomorrow" implies that he is also feeling a sense of desperation. According to Asher, "It's strange to sit down and write a song about not talking ... but we managed to do it and it came off well."

Wilson thought that "Don't Talk" had an overall mood similar to his 1963 song "Lonely Sea", explaining, "It's a different setting, but the emotion is the same." His then-wife Marilyn opined that the lyrics demonstrated Wilson at his most "romantic", and that "[o]ther people would have thought [the message] was sissyish, but he was very romantic, and that was just coming from two people just being close." In reference to the line "Listen to my heartbeat", Brian reflected, "I felt very deeply about that line. One of the sweetest songs I ever sang. I have to say I'm proud of it. The innocence of youth in my voice, of being young and childlike. I think that's what people liked."

Music journalist Geoffrey Himes describes the song as a "ballad that featured Brian singing in a devotional high tenor about the romantic moment when words fail." Biographer Timothy White suggests that the lyrics can be interpreted as both "a peaceful meditation on romantic tranquility" and "a song of reunion for any loved ones." Conversely, author Jim Fusilli felt that the lyrics suggest "the way you express your love for someone who is ready to go ... it's what you say when you know it's the last time you'll hold her in your arms."

Composition

Harmonic structure

"Don't Talk" is among the most harmonically complex songs that Wilson ever composed. The key is ambiguous and unstable, lending difficulty to its identification. Although it most closely suggests G major. the only G chord in the song appears in second inversion, with a fifth in the root, furthering the tonal instability.

The song is an AABA style ballad written in  metre. This metre is implied solely by the melody, as the only rhythmic and percussive feature is a ride cymbal being tapped with a brush. In White's description, the cymbal is struck "with clocklike rhythm"; the instrumentation, coupled with Wilson's "unrestrained" vocal, "invoked the milieu of a requiem". A half-diminished chord (PØ7) appears on the line "I can see so much in your eyes", adding a sense of drama to the mood.

Musicologist Philip Lambert identifies a stepwise motif in the call-and-response melodies – one which ascends before the other descends – heard on the line "there are words we both could say". The resultant "arch figure" is then echoed by the instruments on every two bars. In his analysis, Lambert writes,

Arrangement
In his 2003 book about Pet Sounds, Charles Granata writes that "Don't Talk" is the track on the album that best demonstrates Wilson's "exquisite use" of word painting, such as on the line "Listen to my heart beat", in which the Fender bass line evokes the sounds of a beating heart. In other parts of the song, timpani attacks further accentuate this effect. Himes supports, "When Brian sang in an intimate hush, 'Don't talk; take my hand and listen to my heartbeat. Listen! Listen! Listen!' the music demanded that you listen just as closely to its throbbing pulse."  Moreover, he writes, "A string [sextet] played the minor seventh chords at close intervals, while the tympani boomed and a fat-toned electric bass drifted from the expected root note to create harmonic tensions within the lush sound."

Prior to "Don't Talk", Wilson had rarely used string sections in his work. In this song, he augmented the basic track with an overdubbed string sextet (four violins, one viola, and a cello) in pursuit of a "dark, expressive" effect that Granata compares to "the sound favored by Johannes Brahms". Record producer Phil Ramone said of this song, "Though [Brian] might not have studied Brahms or Ravel, he heard them in his head. That is evident in these chords, and the way they were voiced. It was unusual for pop music at that time." Violinist Nancy Ciminnisi commented,

Recording

Wilson recorded a piano demo of "Don't Talk" in late 1965. Lambert identified several differences between the final composition; the piano rendition is "faster, more rhythmic, less contemplative [and] has some additional bars between phrases ... different chord changes, in spots, and includes only the verses, with no hint of the 'listen' section at the end." He also noted similarities with the opening of Jan and Dean's 1964 hit "Dead Man's Curve", a song that Wilson had co-authored. The tape of Wilson's demo was lost and later rediscovered in the 1990s; it was then included on the 1997 box set The Pet Sounds Sessions.

On October 13, 1965, the same day Wilson produced the backing track of "The Little Girl I Once Knew", he recorded an eight-part a cappella version of "Don't Talk" at Western Studios that was ultimately discarded. Two days later, on October 15, he recorded renditions of the standards "Stella by Starlight" and "How Deep Is the Ocean?" with orchestral arrangements by Dick Reynolds. Biographer Mark Dillon surmised that these recordings were experimental exercises in recording orchestras, and that Wilson "felt the need to hone his chops in that area" before recording "Don't Talk".

Weeks after he had begun writing with Asher, on February 11, 1966, Wilson recorded the basic track and vocal at Western Studios with assistance from eight session musicians, including drummer Hal Blaine, guitarists Glen Campbell and Billy Strange, percussionist Frank Capp, pianist Steve Douglas, and bassists Carol Kaye and Lyle Ritz. It is one of two tracks on Pet Sounds where Wilson's lead vocal is not augmented with backing vocals, the other being "Caroline, No", and one of three tracks where he is the only Beach Boy performing. After bouncing the tape, on April 3, Wilson overdubbed the string sextet at the same studio.

"Don't Talk" is the only track from Pet Sounds for which no other recordings from the tracking session could be found in 1996, thus, a "session highlights" excerpt could not be included on The Pet Sounds Sessions.

Critical reception

On May 16, 1966, "Don't Talk" was released as the fourth track on Pet Sounds. In his self-described "unbiased" review of the album for Record Mirror, Norman Jopling described the song as having a "hymnal sound ... with a tremendous atmosphere ... of late night, very tired sitting on the rug at your girl's place." Reviewing the song for AllMusic, Jim Esch praised "Don't Talk" as among "Brian Wilson's lushest romantic compositions" and "a hymn to love's tactile sensibility -- a gorgeous love song by any standard, and a triumph of Wilson's mature arranging powers."

Asher remembered that he was "literally speechless" when he heard the completed track. He reflected, "I always thought this song was one hell of an example of Brian's musical sophistication ... I never realized that Brian had that kind of talent for serious arranging before I heard this recording." Bruce Johnston said, "I think I was in awe of the string arrangement, how so few strings could do so much. He had very small, 'baby' orchestras. He made everything sound like you could set it up in your living room and stand in the middle. And maybe add some echo later. He absolutely under-produced his sweetening."

Influence
Musician Elvis Costello commented, "I heard 'Don't Talk (Put Your Head on My Shoulder)' played on the cello. It sounded beautiful and sad, just as it does on Pet Sounds. So now you know, if all the record players in the world get broken tomorrow, these songs could be heard a hundred years from now."

Cibo Matto's Yuka Honda commented, "Brian Wilson’s chord progressions tell the most heartbreaking yet beautiful and silently intense story of the duality of life, all from a place of hope. The six bar intro of 'Don’t Talk (Put Your Head on My Shoulder)' is worth a thousand books. I consider it to be one of the greatest chord changes ever written."

Personnel 

Per band archivist Craig Slowinski.

The Beach Boys
 Brian Wilson – vocal

Session musicians (also known as "the Wrecking Crew")

 Hal Blaine – ride cymbal
 Glen Campbell – 12-string electric guitar
 Frank Capp – vibraphone, timpani
 Al de Lory – Hammond B3 organ
 Steve Douglas – acoustic grand piano
 Carol Kaye – bass guitar
 Lyle Ritz – upright bass
 Billy Strange – 12-string electric guitar

The Sid Sharp Strings

 Arnold Belnick – violin
 Norman Botnick – viola
 Joseph Saxon – cello
 Ralph Schaeffer – violin
 Sid Sharp – violin
 Tibor Zelig – violin

Cover versions

 1993 – Linda Ronstadt, Winter Light
 1998 – Fennesz, Plays
 2001 – Anne Sofie von Otter and Elvis Costello, For the Stars
 2022 – Jeff Beck and Johnny Depp, 18

Notes

References

Bibliography

External links
 
 
 
 

1966 songs
The Beach Boys songs
Linda Ronstadt songs
Songs written by Tony Asher
Songs written by Brian Wilson
Song recordings produced by Brian Wilson